Anastasia Potapova and Yana Sizikova defeated Angelina Gabueva and Anastasia Zakharova in the final, 6–3, 6–4 to win the doubles tennis title at the 2022 Prague Open.

Marie Bouzková and Lucie Hradecká were the defending champions, but Bouzková did not participate. Hradecká partnered Andrea Sestini Hlaváčková in the latter's final professional tournament, but lost in the quarterfinals to Miyu Kato and Samantha Murray Sharan.

Seeds

Draw

Draw

References

External links
Main draw

Prague Open - Doubles
2022 Doubles